The 1972 Tasman Series was a motor racing competition staged in New Zealand and Australia for racing cars complying with the Tasman Formula. The series, which began on 8 January and ended on 27 February after eight races, was the ninth annual Tasman Series. It was won by Graham McRae of New Zealand, driving a Leda GM1 Chevrolet.

Races

Additional information sourced from:

Points system
Series points were awarded at each round on the following basis.

All scores from all rounds were counted.

Series standings

References

1972
Tasman Series
Tasman Series
Formula 5000